El Gora Airport  is an airport serving the town of El Gorah, Egypt, which is  from the border with Israel, and  from the southern tip of the Gaza Strip.

See also

Transport in Egypt
List of airports in Egypt

References

External links
OurAirports – Egypt
  Great Circle Mapper – El Gora
El Gora Airport
OpenStreetMap – El Gora
 Google Earth

Airports in Egypt